During the 2022 Russian invasion of Ukraine Russia military forces have repeatedly attacked Ukrainian medical facilities and hospitals, with at least 703 attacks on Ukrainian healthcare facilities carried out by November 2022, with 144 such facilities completely destroyed by Russian strikes, in what constitutes multiple instances of war crimes.

The Ministry of Defense of the United Kingdom stated that Russia was prioritizing attacks on Ukrainian medical facilities as a method of warfare, often striking these with Iranian-made drones.

The most widely covered attacks was the bombing of the Mariupol maternity hospital. The attacks have been independently verified and are violations of international law breaching medical neutrality. The deadliest attack occurred on February 24, 2022, at the Central City Hospital in Vuhledar when a Russian ballistic missile full of cluster munitions fell just outside of the hospital, killing four and injuring ten.

Between February 24 and March 21, 2022, sixty-four medical facilities and their personnel were targeted by Russian forces in Ukraine, the World Health Organization (WHO) reported. The facilities were being hit at rate of two to three a day, inflicting 15 deaths and 37 injuries. By April 8, 2022, WHO had confirmed 91 attacks.

On 23 November Russian missile strikes destroyed a maternity ward in Ukraine's Zaporizhzhia region, in the town of Vilnyansk, killing a newborn baby.

References

2020s building bombings
Airstrikes conducted by Russia
Airstrikes during the 2022 Russian invasion of Ukraine
Attacks on buildings and structures in 2022
Attacks on buildings and structures in Ukraine
Attacks on hospitals
Building bombings in Europe
Russian war crimes in Ukraine
War crimes during the 2022 Russian invasion of Ukraine